Winterberg (Westphalian: Winnenmerg) is a town in the Hochsauerland district of North Rhine-Westphalia, central Germany and a major winter sport resort of the Wintersport Arena Sauerland.

Geography
Winterberg is located in the middle of the Sauerland, at the source of the Ruhr and Lenne rivers.

Neighbouring municipalities
 Bad Berleburg
 Hallenberg 
 Medebach
 Olsberg
 Schmallenberg

Division of the town
After the local government reforms of 1975 Winterberg consists of 15 districts:

 Altastenberg
 Altenfeld
 Elkeringhausen
 Grönebach
 Hildfeld
 Hoheleye
 Langewiese
 Lenneplätze
 Mollseifen
 Neuastenberg
 Niedersfeld
 Siedlinghausen
 Silbach
 Winterberg
 Züschen

History

Town Origin 
Winterberg was declared a city by Archbishop Konrad von Hochstaden (1238-’61) about 1270. The foundation of the city of Winterberg was presumably carried out together with the cloister in Küstelberg. Here indicates a document of 1276 in which the rights are regulated in the town between archbishop and cloister. In this document a church is mentioned in Winterberg whose precursor presumably goes back till the time about 1225. 
The city fortification seems to have granted in the 14th century first only very much restricted protection. The count von Waldeck conquered the town 1321. About 1357 Winterberg became destroyed by Gottfried IV. von Arnsberg during his war with the Cologne archbishop Wilhelm von Gennep . For the reconstruction the archbishop granted an at first ten-year-old tax freedom. This was extended in 1370 and 1374 in each case by other five years. At this time Winterberg owned the same town right like Hallenberg.
Winterberg was a member of the Hanseatic League from the 13th until the 17th century. The town was in the middle of two trade roads, Heidenstrasse between Cologne and Kassel and Heerstrasse between Frankfurt am Main and Soest. The bad agricultural conditions led to the fact that trade played a central role as a life basis of the town.

Deserted Medieval Town
Between 1350 and 1500 the surrounding settlements of Wernsdorf, Merleheim, Haarfeld, Günninghausen and Elkeringhausen were abandoned by their inhabitants. They often moved to Winterberg while they maintained the possession rights on their land. 
The abandonment of the old settlements is likely related to the plague and also to the frequent feuds and lootings of the time, since bigger towns offered a better protection against enemy troops. Only the cities/towns of Winterberg, Hallenberg, Schmallenberg and Medebach were presumably inhabited at this time. The surrounding areas were most likely left completely deserted.

Modern times 'til the end of the Thirty Years' War (1500–1650)
By the acquisition of region "Marken" the area of Winterberg strongly extended. There were similar trends in neighbouring towns. At the beginning of the 16th century Winterberg expanded her farmland in the area of Astenberg. Thereby they got during conflict with the count of von Waldeck who owned rights in the neighbouring village Nordenau. From southwest her territorial claims overlapped with the county Wittgenstein. This quarrel stretched with both opponents up to the end of the 18th century. In a comparison with Wittgenstein 1783 the debatable area was split.
During the Thirty Years' War the neighbouring town Medebach and Hallenberg were 1634 destroyed by Hessian troops. Both had to suffer very much from contributions, lootings and murders. Besides, still the plague broke out soon afterwards. Both towns thereby had to register big population losses. This destiny seems to have remained saved to the city of Winterberg to a great extent. An important clue for this is that in 1638/39 the town council could buy a new organ for 240 imperial talers. Vice versa this could be the trigger for a vain siege of the town about 1640. The Winterberger shooters repulsed therefore attacking Hessen and Sweden successfully.

Witch hunts
As in many other places in the Duchy of Westphalia, between the 16th and 18th centuries, witch trials and executions took place in Winterberg. The exact number is unknown because the source material is extremely poor. Documented witch trials took place in 1523, probably 1562, 1629 and possibly 1728. On November 19, 1993, at the site of the "Winterberger Halsgerichts" a monument was opened as a memorial to the victims of the 16th century witch hunts.

Points of interest
The second highest mountain of the Sauerland, the Kahler Asten in the Rothaargebirge, is located in the city area, which also contains the spring of the Lenne and Ruhr rivers.

Sport
The city is one of the winter sports centers of the Sauerland, best known probably for the bobsleigh, luge, and skeleton track. In 2003, there were the first official World Wok Championships, initiated by Stefan Raab.

Coat of arms
The arms show the city (the city walls only existed between 1261 and 1266) behind the patron of the city, Saint James, as Winterberg is located on one of the Ways of St. James.

International relations

Winterberg is twinned with:
  Le Touquet (France) -- since 1974
  Rijssen - Holten (Netherlands) -- since 1974
  Rixensart (Belgium) -- since 1989
  Oberhof (Germany) -- since 1990
  Sölden (Austria) -- since 2018
  Holmenkollen (Norway) -- since 2018
  Bariloche (Argentina) -- since 2018

References

External links

  
 Historical website of Gee radar chain 1950's

Towns in North Rhine-Westphalia
Rothaar Mountains
Hochsauerlandkreis
Ski areas and resorts in Germany
Members of the Hanseatic League